Lasiochilinae is a subfamily of bugs, in the family Anthocoridae; some authorities place this at family level: "Lasiochilidae".

Tribe and genera
BioLib includes:
tribe Lasiochilini Carayon, 1972
 Lasiochilus Reuter, 1871
 Plochiocoris Champion, 1900
incertae sedis
 Eusolenophora Poppius, 1909
 Lasiellidea Reuter, 1895
 Lasiocolpus Reuter, 1884
 Oplobates Reuter, 1895
 Plochiocorella Poppius, 1909

Systematics
Phylogenetic work in 2009 suggested that "Lasiochilidae" could be treated as a family separate from Anthocoridae (as well as the recognition of the family Lyctocoridae), but this does not appear to be widely supported.

Habitat and behaviour
Species mostly feed on other small soft-bodied arthropods.

References

External links
 

 
Cimicomorpha
Hemiptera subfamilies